Wilson Township is an inactive township in Greene County, in the U.S. state of Missouri.

Wilson Township was named after Wilsons Creek.

References

Townships in Missouri
Townships in Greene County, Missouri